Conrod Settlement  is a rural community of the Halifax Regional Municipality in the Canadian province of Nova Scotia.

References
Explore HRM
Conrod Settlement on Destination Nova Scotia

Communities in Halifax, Nova Scotia
General Service Areas in Nova Scotia